Qalehlar or Qaleh Lar may refer to:
 Qalehlar, East Azerbaijan
 Qaleh Lar, West Azerbaijan